Pierrette Gabrielle Herzberger-Fofana (born 20 March 1949 in Bamako) is a German-Malian politician of Alliance 90/The Greens and member of the European Parliament.

Early life and education
Herzberger-Fofana grew up in Senegal. She graduated in Paris in German sociolinguistics and obtained a further degree from the University of Trier. She earned her doctorate at the University of Erlangen-Nuremberg with a dissertation that addressed women's literature in francophone sub-Saharan Africa.

Political career
In 2005, Herzberger-Fofana was first elected to the city council of Erlangen. She was one of the fifteen recipients of the 2009 Helene-Weber-Preis, which is awarded to women engaged in municipal politics. She is a board member of DaMigra, the umbrella organization of immigrant organizations.

Herzberger-Fofana moved into the European Parliament on the 21st place in the European list of Alliance 90 / The Greens in the 2019 European elections in Germany 2019. She is currently Germany's only black MEP.

Herzberger-Fofana currently serves on the Committee on Development. In addition to her committee assignments, Herzberger-Fofana is part of the Parliament's delegations for relations with the Pan-African Parliament and to the CARIFORUM-EU Parliamentary Committee. She also co-chairs the European Parliament Anti-Racism and Diversity Intergroup.

Personal life
She has three children.

On 17 June 2020, Herzberger-Fofana claimed to have been harassed by two police officers in Brussels. The accusation was made in the chamber of the European parliament. Brussels prosecutors issued a criminal complaint against her for defamation as well as for “acting rebelliously and insulting police officers”.

Works 
 Écrivains africains et identités culturelles: entretiens, Stauffenburg, 1989, 
 Litterature feminine francophone d'Afrique noire, Editions L'Harmattan, 2001, 
 Die Nacht des Baobab. Zur Situation der ausländischen Frau am Beispiel von Afrikanerinnen in Deutschland In: Afro-Look: eine Zeitung von schwarzen Deutschen, Band 8, 1992/93, S. 14–15. (1992 Rede zur International Women's Day)
 Berlin 125 Jahre danach: Eine fast vergessene deutsch-afrikanische Geschichte, aa-infohaus, 2010, .

References

External links 
 Official Website of Pierrette Herzberger-Fofana

1949 births
Living people
Alliance 90/The Greens MEPs
MEPs for Germany 2019–2024
21st-century women MEPs for Germany
People from Bamako
University of Trier alumni
University of Erlangen-Nuremberg alumni
German people of Senegalese descent
Senegalese emigrants to Germany
21st-century German women politicians